Vasantdada Patil was sworn in as Maharashtra chief minister for the third time in February 1983, on resignation of Babasaheb Bhosale. The third Patil ministry continued until 1985 legislative elections, after which Patil continued as chief minister with his fourth ministry.

List of ministers
The ministry consisted of 15 cabinet ministers, including Patil.

References

Indian National Congress
1983 in Indian politics
P
Cabinets established in 1983
Cabinets disestablished in 1985